Asotin Junior-Senior High School, locally referred to as Asotin High School or AHS, is a four-year public high school located in Asotin, Washington. The school has a population of 250-300 students and holds grades 9-12.

The school mascot is the Panther. The school colors are orange, black and white.

Athletics
Asotin High School offers a variety of sports, clubs and activities for students to participate in throughout the school year. Sports offered in the fall include: cross country, football, and volleyball. Winter sports include: boys' basketball and girls' basketball. Spring sports include: baseball, softball, track and golf.

State championships
1985 Baseball
1990 Girls' Basketball
2006 Football
2009 Boys' Golf
2013 Boys' Track and Field

Other activities offered
FCCLA (Family Career And Community Leaders of America), which is for students interested in family and consumer science education.
FFA (Future Farmers of America), which is for students interested in agricultural studies.
National Honor Society, which is for students with high academic achievement, and focuses on community service.
FBLA (Future Business Leaders of America)
Cheerleading, which is for students interested in cheering, stunts and tumbling at school sports games.
Student Council, which is for students interested in learning leadership skills while working with the school administration.
Concert Band/Choir
Jazz Band/Choir
AHS also participates yearly in the national Junior Miss scholarship program, in which eleventh-grade level girls' are eligible to participate.
Bob Saget Fan Club

Awards
Asotin High School was awarded the 2007-08 School of Distinction Award from the State of Washington.

References

High schools in Asotin County, Washington
Public high schools in Washington (state)